The Cumberland Bandits are a junior ice hockey team based in Cumberland, Ottawa, Ontario, Canada.  They are members of the National Capital Junior Hockey League but were inactive for the 2018–19 season. As of 2021, they have not returned to league play.

History
In 2008, the ownership of the Casselman Stars of the Eastern Ontario Junior C Hockey League (EOJCHL) and the town of Casselman were awarded a franchise within the Eastern Ontario Junior B Hockey League. The new team became the Casselman Vikings. As a result, they sold their interests in the EOJCHL Casselman Stars to Claude Pothier from Navan. In 2008, the team became known as the Cumberland Bandits and played their home games out of Ray Friel in Orleans. In 2010, Claude Pothier sold the franchise to the Bedard family. The EOJCHL also rebranded as the National Capital Junior Hockey League (NCJHL) in 2010.

The Bandits have grown to include the junior C team, nine AAA spring hockey clubs, and one amateur men's team.

On June 15, 2018, the NCJHL announced the Bandits would not participate in the 2018–19 season.

Season-by-season record
Note: GP = Games played, W = Wins, L = Losses, T = Ties, OTL = Overtime losses, GF = Goals for, GA = Goals against

Awards

Team honours

External links
Bandits Homepage

Ice hockey teams in Ontario
Ice hockey clubs established in 1986
1986 establishments in Ontario